Pedro Gamboa (died 18 November 1510) was a Roman Catholic prelate who served as Bishop of Carinola (1497–1510).

Biography
On 20 December 1497, Pedro Gamboa was appointed during the papacy of Pope Alexander VI as Coadjutor Bishop of Carinola.
On 30 September 1498, he was consecrated bishop by Geremia Contugi, Bishop of Assisi, with Giuliano Maffei, Bishop of Bertinoro, and Carlo Bocconi, Bishop of Vieste, serving as co-consecrators. 
In 1501, he succeeded to the bishopric. 
He served as Bishop of Carinola until his death on 18 November 1510.

References

External links and additional sources
 (for Chronology of Bishops) 
 (for Chronology of Bishops) 

15th-century Italian Roman Catholic bishops
16th-century Italian Roman Catholic bishops
Bishops appointed by Pope Alexander VI
1510 deaths